The Bollywood Movie Awards was an annual film award ceremony held between 1999 and 2007 in Long Island, New York, United States, celebrating films and actors from the Bollywood film industry based in Mumbai, India.

History
The predecessor to the award ceremony was introduced in 1992 by Kamal Dandona, the head of The Bollywood Group and was originally titled, "Nataraj Awards". It was renamed and relaunched as Bollywood Movie Awards in 1999. Michael Jackson won a Humanitarian Award in 1999, Richard Gere a Man of Conscience award, and Sharon Stone an award connected to her work with AIDS. During the 2007 ceremonies, Danny Glover received an award for Outstanding Contribution to Global Entertainment and Mira Nair for Pride of India Award. Phylicia Rashad and Donald Trump also made appearances. These awards are given to those well deserving due to their excellent skills of acting and those who know the craft. They are applauded-on several occasions including those of IIFA and Filmfare awards.

Fans
Fans of Bollywood films nominated their favourite stars for each respective award category on the Bollywood Group's official website. They appreciate the work of Indian film stars and on annual polls for awards they vote for their favourite candidates. the chosen candidate then picks up the award at the ceremony.

Awards

 Best Film
 Best Director
 Best Actor
 Best Actress
 Best Supporting Actor
 Best Supporting Actress
 Best Villain
 Best Comedian
 Best Male Debut
 Best Female Debut
 Critics Award Male
 Critics Award Female
 Most Sensational Actor
 Most Sensational Actress
 Best Lyricist
 Best Music
 Best Singer Male
 Best Singer Female
 Best Costume Designer
 Best Choreography
 Best Story: 2007 only, to Rajkumar Hirani & Abhijat Joshi for Lage Raho Munna Bhai
 Best Dialogue

See also
 Cinema of India

References

External links
 Official website
 Booray for Bollywood! - Esquire
 B'wood razzmatazz at film awards in NY - CNN-IBN